Per Nils Anders Grönhagen (born 22 May 1953) is a former football manager and former football player.

Club career
Born in Gudmundrå, Sweden, Grönhagen made his debut for Kramfors IF in Division 3 as a 15-year-old. In 1972, he joined GIF Sundsvall to play in Division 2 Norra. With GIF Sundsvall, he qualified for the 1975 Allsvenskan and played 25 matches in his Allsvenskan debut season.

For the 1976 season, Grönhagen joined Djurgårdens IF Fotboll. Over eight seasons, he played 146 league games for Djurgården and scored 48 goals. In 1983, Grönhagen returned to GIF Sundsvall. He finished his playing career in 1985.

International career 
He earned 18 international caps and scored four goals for Sweden.

Managerial career
Grönhagen started his management career in GIF Sundsvall from 1986 to 89, before coaching IFK Sundsvall from 1990 to 92, Djurgårdens IF from 1994 to 96, GIF Sundsvall from 1999 to 2001. In 2002, he took over IF Elfsborg. He left Elfsborg after two seasons in 2003.

In November 2003, it was announced that Grönhagen was to take over IF Brommapojkarna for the 2004 season. He left after one season. In September 2006, Grönhagen started his second tenure in Djurgårdens IF, taking over from Kjell Jonevret. He managed the team for the remaining six matches of the season

Grönhagen joined Norwegian Tippeligaen side Fredrikstad FK in 2007. He finished second in the 2008 Tippeligaen before leaving in 2009.

Career statistics

Honours
GIF Sundsvall
 Division 2 Norra: 1974

Djurgårdens IF
 Division 2 Norra: 1982

Notes

References

External links

1953 births
Living people
Association football forwards
Swedish footballers
Sweden international footballers
Sweden youth international footballers
Swedish football managers
Allsvenskan players
Djurgårdens IF Fotboll players
GIF Sundsvall players
Djurgårdens IF Fotboll managers
IF Elfsborg managers
IF Brommapojkarna managers
Fredrikstad FK managers
GIF Sundsvall managers
Djurgårdens IF Fotboll directors and chairmen